Johan Brunström and Raven Klaasen were the defending champions but decided not to participate.

Herbert and Olivetti won the title, defeating Toni Androić and Nikola Mektić in the final, 6–4, 6–3.

Seeds

Draw

Draw

References
 Main Draw

Open BNP Paribas Banque de Bretagne - Doubles
2014 Doubles